Eupithecia jizlensis is a moth in the  family Geometridae. It is found in Saudi Arabia.

Subspecies
Eupithecia jizlensis jizlensis
Eupithecia jizlensis muelleri Hausmann, 1991

References

Moths described in 1986
jizlensis
Moths of Asia